Alexey Alexandrovich Kuznetsov  ( – 1 October 1950) was a Soviet statesman, CPSU (since 1925) functionary, Lieutenant General, member of CPSU Central Committee (1939-1949).

He was Second Secretary (deputy leader) to Leningrad CPSU gorkom (city committee) and obkom (oblast committee), and, during the Siege of Leningrad, helped organize the city's defense. For his work during the siege, he was promoted to First Secretary in 1945.

Zhdanov was thought to want Kuznetsov to replace him as CC Party Chairman. Kuznetsov was also believed to be a possible replacement for Stalin on the latter's death. He was a strong supporter of Stalin, who appointed him to head the security functions of the party, showing how much the Soviet leader trusted him.

The beginning of Kuznetsov’s fall came when Stalin demoted him and returned him to a minor post in Leningrad (a frequent sign that the subject was destined for a final fall).  This may have been because Kuznetsov had been digging into Kirov's death - suspicion of Stalin’s involvement in this murder has never been put to rest. Eventually Kuznetsov was arrested, tried and sentenced to death in a secret trial during the Leningrad Affair. He was executed in 1950.

His death consolidated the power of Malenkov, Beria and Bulganin, with the inference that they may have been involved in the charges, fabricated or not.

He was rehabilitated posthumously.

Honours and awards
 Two Orders of Lenin
 Medal "For the Defence of Leningrad"

References

Soviet politicians
Russian people executed by the Soviet Union
Members of the Communist Party of the Soviet Union executed by the Soviet Union
Soviet rehabilitations
1905 births
1950 deaths
Executed people from Novgorod Oblast
Recipients of the Order of Lenin
Executed Soviet people from Russia
People executed for corruption
Residents of the Benois House